Charles Ingram Courtenay Wood, 2nd Earl of Halifax,  (3 October 1912 – 19 March 1980), 4th Viscount Halifax of Monk Bretton, 6th Baronet Wood of Barnsley in the County of York, and 2nd Baron Irwin of Kirby Underdale in the County of York, was a British peer, Conservative politician, Lord Lieutenant of Humberside and High Steward of York Minster.

Early life and education
Wood was the son of Edward Wood, 1st Earl of Halifax, statesman and Foreign Secretary, and Lady Dorothy Evelyn Augusta Wood (née Onslow). He was educated at Eton College. Charles graduated from Christ Church, University of Oxford, Oxford, England, in 1934 with a Bachelor of Arts (B.A.) degree. He successfully captained the Oxford University Polo Team in the same year.

Career
He gained the rank of 2nd Lieutenant in 1934 in the service of the Royal Horse Guards. Like his father, Wood also entered politics, becoming Member of Parliament (MP) for the City of York in 1937, as a Conservative. In 1939, at the outbreak of World War II, he rejoined the Royal Horse Guards and served for three years in the Middle East. Charles was styled Lord Irwin between 1944 and 1959. In 1959, Wood succeeded his father as 2nd Earl of Halifax. He continued as a member of parliament during this time. At the 1945 general election, he lost his seat to the Labour candidate, John Corlett. Charles held the office of Deputy Lieutenant of the East Riding in Yorkshire between 1955 and 1968, Lord-Lieutenant of Humberside between 1974 until 1980 and High Steward of York Minster between 1972 until 1980.

In 1978, his horse Shirley Heights won The Derby. The earl died in 1980 and was buried at All Saints' parish church, Kirby Underdale, where a Halifax family memorial is to be found.

Family

In 1936, he married Ruth Alice Hannah Mary Primrose (18 April 1916 – 1989), daughter of the Liberal politician Captain Neil James Archibald Primrose and Lady Victoria Alice Louise Primrose, née Stanley, a granddaughter of the Prime Minister Archibald Primrose, 5th Earl of Rosebery.

They had three children:
 Lady Caroline Victoria Wood (born 10 September 1937, died 15 November 2014), married, firstly, Randle J. Feilden in 1958 (divorced in 1970), secondly, John V. Gosling in 1970.
Virginia Mary Feilden (born 6 June 1959, died 24 March 1994)
Randle Charles Roderick Feilden (born 19 January 1961)
Fiona Caroline Feilden (born 26 January 1965)
 Lady Susan Diana Wood (born 22 September 1938), married Brigadier Ian Darsie Watson in 1959.
David Charles Darsie Watson (born 29 July 1960)
Richard Ian Watson (born 30 January 1962)
 The Rt Hon. Charles Edward Peter Neil Wood, 3rd Earl of Halifax (born 14 March 1944)
The Hon James Charles Wood, Lord Irwin (born 24 August 1977) Heir Apparent to the earldom.
Hon. Rex Patrick Wood (born 12 August 2010)
Hon. Audrey Nancy Wood (born 23 January 2013)
Lady Joanna Victoria Wood (born 15 January 1980)

References

External links

1912 births
1980 deaths
People educated at Eton College
Alumni of Christ Church, Oxford
British racehorse owners and breeders
Owners of Epsom Derby winners
Wood, Charles
Lord-Lieutenants of the East Riding of Yorkshire
Royal Horse Guards officers
Wood, Charles
UK MPs who inherited peerages
British Army personnel of World War II
Wood family
Conservative Party (UK) hereditary peers
Earls of Halifax